Powassan encephalitis, caused by the Powassan virus (POWV), a flavivirus also known as the  deer tick virus, is a form of arbovirus infection that results from tick bites. It can occur as a co-infection with Lyme disease since both are transmitted to humans by the same species of tick. There has been a surge in the number of cases and geographic range in the last decade. In the United States, cases have been recorded in the northeast. The disease was first isolated from the brain of a boy who died of  encephalitis in Powassan, Ontario, in 1958. The disease is a zoonosis, an animal disease, usually found in rodents and ticks, with spillover transmission to humans. The virus is antigenically related to the Far Eastern tick-borne encephalitis viruses.

Presentation
Symptoms manifest within 7–10 days and include fever, headache, partial paralysis, confusion, nausea and even coma.

Diagnosis

Treatment
There is currently no established treatment.

Prognosis
Half of all cases results in permanent neurological damage and 10-15% result in death.

References

External links 

Viral encephalitis
Tick-borne diseases